Murraysburg is an Afrikaans speaking town of approximately 5,000 people in the Western Cape province of South Africa. It is governed as part of the Beaufort West Local Municipality within the Central Karoo District Municipality.

Murraysburg is situated on the R63 regional road, which connects it to the N1 and N12 national roads to the west and the N9 to the east.

History
Murraysburg, lies in North East of West South Africa, was founded in 1856 on a farm named "Eenzaamheid" (Dutch for "loneliness") and became a municipality in July 1883. It was named after the Reverend Andrew Murray Snr, who was minister of Graaff-Reinet, and Barend O. J. Burger, who played a role in the establishment of the town. An original condition for the purchase of any residential plot in Murraysburg was that the plot had to be fenced with a quince hedge. This unexplained rule meant that Murraysburg once had the largest quantity of quince hedging in the world.

Demographics
According to the 2011 census, Murraysburg has a population of 5,069 people in 1,255 households. 80.7% of these people described themselves as "Coloured", while 18.4% described themselves as "Black African". 87.6% spoke Afrikaans as their first language, while 9.8% spoke Xhosa and 1.0% spoke English.

Infrastructure
The town has public primary and secondary schools, a public library, a provincially aided hospital, a police station and a magistrate's court.

Water supply
During the mid-1800s a water conduit was constructed that delivered an uninterrupted water supply from the Buffels River to town, and lei water furrows distributed this to irrigated properties. A 1988 flood damaged the conduit, and the municipality hesitated to fix it, allowing it to fall into disrepair by the late 1990s.

In 2007, new resident Chris Barr found that Murraysburg had very limited access to water. This was hampering the town's agricultural potential, despite its very fertile soil. Barr and local farmer Izak van der Merwe founded a development council to replace the former Murraysburg Environmental Forum. The Rooidamme water project was conceived as a way of visually creating hope for the town. During September to December 2017, local contractors utilized a R1.5 million grant from the Western Cape’s sustainable resource programme to invigorate the town’s water scheme, and the Water Affairs department renewed the town's water license.

Garlic farming
The Murraysburg heritage garlic cultivar had long been cultivated in the area. Garlic was identified as a labour intensive crop that would be resilient in the harsh climate. A 2016 pilot project introduced commercially valuable Egyptian white garlic, besides the local heritage garlic, and some 1.3 metric ton was harvested. In 2018, some 10,000 m2 of croplands around town were planted, and the yield was divided between harvesting and replanting. A failed vegetable project, initiated but not sustained by government, was also dedicated to garlic.

The town's Rooidamme water project, initiated by the community, was instrumental in placing these areas under irrigation. A company was formed by two residents, employing several residents and supplying several “out growers”. Women are involved in the packing of the garlic bulbs, with a warehouse planned. The 2020 harvest was expected to improve on that of 2019.

References

Populated places in the Beaufort West Local Municipality
Populated places established in 1856